Tlaxco Municipality is a municipality in Puebla in southeastern Mexico.

References

Municipalities of Puebla